KJME may refer to:

 KJME (AM), a radio station (780 AM) licensed to serve Fountain, Colorado, United States
 KCEG (AM), a radio station (890 AM) licensed to serve Fountain, Colorado, which held the call sign KJME from 2005 to 2022